Lourdesia is a genus of millipedes belonging to the family Xystodesmidae.

Species:
 Lourdesia minuscula Shelley, 1991

References

Xystodesmidae